Hennessy Road is a thoroughfare on Hong Kong Island, Hong Kong. 

It connects Yee Wo Street on the east in Causeway Bay, at the junction with East Point Road, Jardine's Bazaar and Great George Street in East Point, through Bowrington, to Queensway on its western end in Wan Chai.

It is a two-way road with two to three lanes of traffic on each side, which is shared by tram services.

The road is named after John Pope Hennessy, the Governor of Hong Kong between 1877 and 1882.

The portion of the road passing through Causeway Bay was one of the locations occupied during the 2014 Hong Kong protests.

Landmarks
 Sogo Hong Kong – department store at 555 Hennessy Road, since 1985
 Hysan Place – shopping mall and office building at 500 Hennessy Road. It is developed by Hysan Development Company Limited at the former site of Hennessy Centre and is due for completion in August 2012.

Transport
The tram once set up its terminal at the end of this street in 20th century (the former site of the Times Square). It now passes through the street to both ends of the Hong Kong Island.

Due to heavy congestion during peak hours, long haul bus routes are not routed through the road.

See also
 Southorn Playground
 List of streets and roads in Hong Kong

References

Wan Chai
Causeway Bay
Roads on Hong Kong Island